Big Grove is a locality in Western Australia. The site is in the traditional settlement area of the Mineng Aboriginal tribe.

Demographics
The median age of persons in Big Grove was 56 years. There were more males than females, with 59.6% of the population male and 40.4% female. The average household size was 1.9 people per household.

References

Great Southern (Western Australia)